Paula Carvalho (born 9 April 1965) is a former synchronized swimmer from Brazil.

Paula's sister is Tessa Carvalho, who was her partner in the women's duet at the 1984 Summer Olympics.

References 

1965 births
Living people
Brazilian synchronized swimmers
Olympic synchronized swimmers of Brazil
Synchronized swimmers at the 1984 Summer Olympics
Synchronized swimmers at the 1988 Summer Olympics